This is a list of notable Ghanaians in the United Kingdom. The person's Ghanaian citizenship and connection to the Republic of Ghana is shown in birthplace and parentheses.

References and notes

See also
 Ghanaians in the United Kingdom
 List of Ghanaians

 
Ghanaian Britons
United Kingdom